Reas may refer to:

People
 Casey Reas (born 1972)
 Paul Reas (born 1955), British photographer and lecturer

Places
 Reas Pass, Idaho
 Reas Run, Idaho

See also
 Rees (disambiguation)